Cultural analysis may refer to:

Cultural analysis, a qualitative research method.
Cultural Analysis: An Interdisciplinary Forum on Folklore and Popular Culture, a scholarly journal.